Bogdan Cuvaj (21 October 1905 – 23 July 1983) was a Croatian football manager in both club and international competition.

Career
He became the manager of Concordia Zagreb's youth side in 1926.  After receiving managerial training in Vienna, Cuvaj became Concordia's manager in 1931, a position he held until the club was banned in 1945.  With the club he won the 1932 Yugoslavian championship and the 1942 Croatian championship. From March 6, 1939 he served as secretary of the Croatian Football Federation and also managed his country under the flag of the Independent State of Croatia, a World War II-era puppet state of Nazi Germany from 1941 to 1945.

After World War II he managed Tekstilac Zagreb (1945–1946), Lokomotiva Zagreb (1946–1952), Metalac Zagreb (1952–1955) and Dinamo Zagreb (1955–1956).

References 
 Nogometni leksikon (2004, in Croatian)

External links
 

1905 births
1983 deaths
Sportspeople from Zagreb
Yugoslav football managers
Croatian football managers
Croatia national football team managers
NK Lokomotiva Zagreb managers
GNK Dinamo Zagreb managers
Kickers Offenbach managers
Yugoslav expatriate football managers
Expatriate football managers in West Germany
Yugoslav expatriate sportspeople in West Germany